Rachel Feinstein is an American actress and stand-up comedian. Feinstein was a finalist on Season 7 of Last Comic Standing. Rachel plays a comedian performing as herself in the feature film Her Composition.

Early life
Feinstein grew up in Bethesda, Maryland. Her father was a civil rights lawyer and a blues musician and her mother was a social worker. Her father is from a Jewish family, whereas her mother converted to Judaism. She moved to New York City at age 17  and slowly developed her character-driven standup act.

Career
Feinstein was a finalist on Season 7 of Last Comic Standing. She played a comedian performing as herself in the feature film Her Composition, directed by Stephan Littger. She has also appeared on the HBO series Crashing.

Personal life
On the Dudley & Bob with Matt Show morning radio show (KLBJ-93.7 FM, Austin, TX), Feinstein announced that her boyfriend at the time was a comedy writer who writes on one of her television shows. During a December 2014 appearance on The View, Feinstein revealed her boyfriend at the time was Tommy Cody, an executive producer of truTV's Impractical Jokers. In September 2018, she married New York City Fire Captain Peter Brennan. Best friend and fellow comedian Amy Schumer was her maid of honor. On February 20, 2020, again on the Dudley & Bob with Matt Afternoon Show (93.7 KLBJ-FM), Rachel stated she was 7 months pregnant. She said she plans to continue performing while she’s pregnant, as long as possible.  She gave birth to a daughter.

Discography 
 2011: Thug Tears
 2016: Only Whores Wear Purple

Filmography 
 Samurai Love God (2006)
 Turbocharge: The Unauthorized Story of The Cars (2008)
 The Venture Bros. (2009-2010; episodes: "Handsome Ransom", "Any Which Way But Zeus")
 Circus Maximus (2010)
 Stags (2011)
 Grand Theft Auto V (2013)
 Peace After Marriage (2013)
 Inside Amy Schumer (2013-2016)
 Teachers Lounge (2014)
 Top Five (2014)
 Stuck on A (2014; episode: "I Did Not Have Relations with That Man!")
 Friends of the People (2014; episode: "The Horror")
 Trainwreck (2015)
 3rd Street Blackout (2015)
 Her Composition (2015)
 Red Oaks (2015)
 Odd Mom Out (2017; episode: "Frisky Business")
 Crashing (2017-2019)
 I Feel Pretty (2018)
 The Standups (2018)
 Historical Roasts (2019, episode "Anne Frank")
 Hysterical (2021)
 Would I Lie to You? USA (2022, episode "Whatcha Doin'?")

References

External links 
 
 Rachel Feinstein's YouTube page
 

Living people
Place of birth missing (living people)
Year of birth missing (living people)
Last Comic Standing contestants
Actresses from Washington, D.C.
American women comedians
21st-century American actresses
American film actresses
Jewish American female comedians
Jewish American actresses
21st-century American comedians
21st-century American Jews